Heinz Welzel (1911–2002) was a German stage, television and film actor. He was also a noted voice actor, dubbing foreign films for German-speaking audiences. He played one of the lead roles in the popular 1939 aviation film D III 88.

Filmography

References

Bibliography 
 Paris, Michael. From the Wright Brothers to Top Gun: Aviation, Nationalism, and Popular Cinema. Manchester University Press, 1995.

External links 
 

1911 births
2002 deaths
German male film actors
Male actors from Berlin